Thạch Kim Tuấn (born 15 January 1994) is a Vietnamese weightlifter of Khmer descent. He won a silver and two bronze medals at the 2011 World Junior Weightlifting Championships in Malaysia. Dubbed the "young hope" by the Vietnam Athletes Association for Weightlifting at the 2012 Summer Olympics – Men's 56 kg but did not qualify. However, he did manage to win a silver medal at the following year's Asian Championships.

Major results

References

External links 
 

 

Vietnamese male weightlifters
1994 births
Weightlifters at the 2010 Summer Youth Olympics
Living people
Weightlifters at the 2014 Asian Games
Weightlifters at the 2018 Asian Games
Asian Games medalists in weightlifting
World Weightlifting Championships medalists
Asian Games silver medalists for Vietnam
Weightlifters at the 2016 Summer Olympics
Olympic weightlifters of Vietnam
Medalists at the 2014 Asian Games
Medalists at the 2018 Asian Games
Khmer Krom people
People from Bình Thuận Province
Southeast Asian Games gold medalists for Vietnam
Southeast Asian Games bronze medalists for Vietnam
Southeast Asian Games medalists in weightlifting
Competitors at the 2011 Southeast Asian Games
Competitors at the 2013 Southeast Asian Games
Competitors at the 2017 Southeast Asian Games
Competitors at the 2019 Southeast Asian Games
Southeast Asian Games silver medalists for Vietnam
Youth Olympic gold medalists for Vietnam
Weightlifters at the 2020 Summer Olympics
21st-century Vietnamese people